Sentani can refer to several things related to the Sentani region on the north coast of New Guinea in the province of Papua, Indonesia:

Places
 District of Sentani, administrative centre in Jayapura Regency
 Sentani Kota, Sentani, Jayapura, administrative centre of Sentani District
 Dortheys Hiyo Eluay International Airport (formerly Sentani International Airport), the airport serving Jayapura
 Lake Sentani, a relatively large, oddly-shaped freshwater lake

Languages
 Sentani language, the language of the Sentani people
 Sentani languages
 East Bird's Head – Sentani languages